The 1988 NSL Cup was the twelfth season of the NSL Cup, which was the main national association football knockout cup competition in Australia. All 14 NSL teams from around Australia entered the competition.

Bracket

Round of 16

Quarter-finals

Semi-finals

Final

References

NSL Cup
Cup
NSL Cup seasons